Brita Elisabeth Gabriella Barnekow (8 February 1874, in Sörby – 2 October 1942, in Stockholm) was a Swedish painter, best remembered for her portrait paintings. Her works have been exhibited at the Nationalmuseum and the Museum of Sketches for Public Art.

References 

1874 births
1942 deaths
Swedish painters